Duffett is a surname. Notable people with the surname include:

Nicola Duffett (born 1963), English actress
Rick Duffett (born 1946), Canadian ice hockey player and coach

See also
Buffett